

History

All Sport was launched by PepsiCo in 1994 as a competitor to The Coca-Cola Company’s Powerade and Gatorade, which at the time was a separate entity owned by Quaker Oats. After PepsiCo's 2001 acquisition of Quaker, All Sport was sold to The Monarch Beverage Company before being acquired by Big Red in 2007.

All Sport was then acquired by Keurig Dr Pepper through an acquisition in 2018. Jel Sert became the primary manufacturer of the brands powdered drink portfolio. This would later lead Jel Sert to make the decision to acquire the business in late 2019.

Products

All Sport products deliver 100% daily value of vitamin C per serving. All Sport currently offers the following products:

All Sport Body Quenchers Powder
Variety Pack
Blue Raz Ice
Lemon Lime
Orange
Fruit Punch 
Grape

All Sport Zero Powder Sticks 
Blue Raz Zero
Fruit Punch Zero
Lemon Lime Zero
Orange Zero
Grape Zero
Variety Pack

All Sport Freezer Pops
Variety Pack
Blue Raz Ice
Fruit Punch
Lemon Lime
Orange

All Sport Sugar Free Freezer Pops
Variety Pack
Blue Raz Ice
Fruit Punch
Lemon Lime
Orange

Sponsorships

All Sport has sponsored several athletes and teams.

Tommy Kendall in the Trans-Am Series throughout the nineties
Alexi Lalas, soccer
John Daly, PGA Professional Golfer
Germain Racing with Mike Skinner, NASCAR
Travis Kvapil, of Yates Racing Team
Enrique Bernoldi, Indy 500 and Sonoma Raceway
Erick Dampier, Dallas Basketball Center
Jeremy Mayfield

References

External links
 All Sport Official Website

Sports drinks